Aboisso Airport is an airport  serving Aboisso in the Ivory Coast. Its ICAO code is DIAO and IATA code is ABO.

References

Airports in Ivory Coast
Buildings and structures in Comoé District
Sud-Comoé